= Thespeia =

Thespeia (Ancient Greek: Θέσπεια) was a town in ancient Thessaly. It is unlocated.
